Rain-charm for the Duchy is a book of poems by Ted Hughes. The book contains poems written by Hughes during his tenure as Poet Laureate of the United Kingdom, from 1984. The poems in the book celebrate royal occasions. The book was first published by Faber and Faber in 1992.

References

External links
 Faber & Faber

1992 poetry books
Poetry by Ted Hughes
English poetry collections
Faber and Faber books